Assembly of Deputies may refer to:
Assembly of Deputies of the Nenets Autonomous Okrug
Chamber of Deputies of the Czech Republic
Chamber of Deputies (Tunisia)